Ambuli (moon) is the first Tamil stereoscopic science fiction 3D film written and directed by Hari Shankar and Hareesh Narayan in 2012 who earlier directed Orr Eravuu in 2010 and produced by KTVR Loganathan. The movie ran for over 100 days and became a box-office success. The film was released on 17 February 2012.

Plot 
The film begins with happenings in the Maize fields in a village in South India, where a British forest ranger, who is in charge of the fields, has been alerted by some strange noises coming from inside the fields. He sets out with his dog and searches for the source of this noise. Suddenly, the dog is dragged inside and brutally killed by an unknown beast creature. The name is called Ambuli then, the ranger is also dragged inside and killed. Then the film shifts to the 1970s, a college farewell party going on two college friends, Amudhan and Vendhan, have decided to stay back in the college hostel and spend the vacation there. This is mainly because Amudhan's college girlfriend Poongavanam lives in the nearby village of Poomanandhipuram. Now the Poomanandhipuram is an abandoned village. One night Vendhan, Amudhan decides to go through the cornfield to reach Poomanandhipuram to meet Poongavanam while he returns, he hears the same strange noise and is chased and thrown off his cycle by Ambuli, Amudhan runs to the college, where he meets Vendhan, tells him what happened, and reveals to him that Ambuli is real. And they both decide to visit the cornfield together that night to see what is happening. They both travel the entire field and find a wooden cabin, which is where the ranger once lived, and they meet a mysterious man named Sengodan (Ambuli's Brother) there. Sengodan guards the fields, but his looks cause suspicion to Amudhan and Vendhan that he might be Ambuli and they escape from the cabin.

The next day, Amudhan asks Vendhan's father Vethagiri about Ambuli and Sengodan. Vethagiri is angered by the news that they both travelled alone in the cornfields and tells them as Ambuli lives there. It has killed so many people Vethagiri become an alcoholic to get rid of his fear of Ambuli. He tells about Ambuli About some 40 years ago, on the day of the solar eclipse, a pregnant woman named Ponni, who has no one except her elder child, walks into the village of Poomanandhipuram but faints right under the sun, which it was believed that one who comes out on a solar eclipse will be badly affected by the radiation and she got a baby child the very night. But the baby that was born was not exactly a human: it was half-human and half-beast. The baby attacks and kills a woman. The villagers then locked both Ponni and Ambuli in the house. Ponni, who was given a choice to destroy Ambuli, decides to let Ambuli go, while committing suicide, Ambuli escapes into the fields, and to date, it has been killing humans. Vethagiri also reveals that Sengodan is a murderer.

Vendhan and Amudhan decide to collect more details about Ambuli. So, they visit many people in the village and enquire about Ambuli. During that time, many research film moves to Sir Arthur Wellington (a fictional character).

Sir Arthur Wellington is not only the founder of his self-named college in the southern parts of India but also a scientist who worked with the British army during World War II. After his retirement, he began college in South India. His longtime goal is to successfully carry out and finish his project, which is to create humans who can healthily live for 150 years. He decides to use Ponni as his test subject and injects the Neanderthal DNA that he has collected back in his home country into her womb. This starts having an impact on Ambuli. Wellington dopes her with strong sedatives so that she visits him often for checkups and he can carry out his tests without any problems. As she reaches her due date, she is affected too much by the sedatives and starts heading to Wellington's laboratory to get herself checked. That day turns out to be the solar eclipse, and unfortunately, she is affected by the radiation from the eclipse. This causes a big change in her womb, and thus, Ambuli is born as a beast. Seemati, who checked her pregnancy and is terrified by the looks and behavior of Ambuli, tells Ponni to kill Ambuli. But she lets Ambuli escape and commits suicide out of humiliation. Angered by this, Sengodan kills Wellington, who is the reason for all this.

Now having collected all details about Ambuli, the men decide that there is no use for anyone to hide from Ambuli, and they must fight against it. Poongavanam and Valarmalai decide to check on Amudhan and Vendhan that night, having been well aware of their investigation on Ambuli. Both the tuition master and landlord discovered their disappearances that night. The landlord accepts the plan, and the villagers decide to set out to hunt and destroy Ambuli for good. Poongavanam somehow gets trapped between thorn bushes in the cornfields but is helped by Sengodan, only for Sengodan to capture and gag her at the cabin. Amudhan and Vendhan arrive to find Sengodan, only to find Poongavanam there, tied up and gagged. Amudhan and Vendhan then reveal Ambuli's location to Poongavanam, only for Sengodan to overhear their conversation and offer to go along with them. While setting out to meet Ambuli, Valarmalai attempts to attack Sengodan upon thinking he got Amudhan, Vendhan, and Poongavanam captives, only to stop by them and ended up joining them. They visit the caves at night, and there comes a tall, fierce-looking ape-like creature, which is finally shown and revealed to be Ambuli. As Ambuli tries to attack the group, Sengodan fights it bravely. The villagers also rush to the caves. Suddenly, the army and police arrive there with tranquilizers, having been alerted by the head police officer, who is convinced by Amudhan and Vendhan that Ambuli does exist. After an intense battle in the field between the army, the police, and Ambuli, Ambuli is tranquilized with the help of Sengodan. The army captures Ambuli, and he is taken away in a secured box. Sengodan is heavily injured by Ambuli but manages to survive. He reveals that he wanted to kill and destroy Ambuli right after killing Wellington but was arrested, only to be released years later. When asked by Amudhan and Vendhan on why he killed Gugan and kidnapped Poongavanam, Sengodan revealed that he had mistaken Gugan as Ambuli and he was also trying to save Poongavanam from Ambuli. The villagers finally thank Sengodan, Marudhan, Amudhan and Vendhan for their heroics in capturing Ambuli and thus ending their longtime fear.
 
As the credits roll out, a final shot is shown which is to happen in Dehradun, where the box in which Ambuli is being carried. The box slowly starts moving a little and cracks suddenly. It is to be understood that Ambuli escapes from the box and sets on his next hunt. The film ends with a line in Tamil, which translates to Ambuli's hunt will continue.

Cast

Production
Hari Shankar and Hareesh Narayan, who made their directorial debut with the horror film Orr Eravuu (2010), decided to shoot a mystery thriller based on folklore and superstition. In an interview they stated: "We have taken inspirations from folklore and Ambuli tells the story of a village which is soaked in superstitions. Ambuli means ‘moon’ and it is a moon light mystery". The film was promoted as being the "first ever-stereoscopic 3D film in Tamil cinema". The directors further disclosed that the plot revolved around "four youngsters who go in search of a story, the problems they face and how they overcome them", while clarifying that there was no villain in the film. Newcomers R. Ajai, P. S. Srijith,
Sanam and Jothisha Ammu were signed on to enact the lead roles, while Gokulnath, best known from the reality-based dance competition Maanada Mayilada was selected to play the titular character. The filming began on 4 February 2011.

Theatrical Release
Ambuli was released on 17 February 2012 in both polarised and anaglyph 3D formats. In the first week, the film was screened in 100 theatres with polarised format in most of the theatres in Chennai and in anaglyph format outside of Chennai in many theatres not having the facility of polarised 3D which required silver-coated screen and two projectors supposed to be expensive at that time. In the third week, seven theatres from Madurai, Coimbatore, and Trichy agreed and equipped their screens with polarised 3D based on the enormous response from the audience for the film.

Reception
Times of India rated the movie 3.5/5 and Behindwoods rated Ambuli 3/5 calling it between ‘not bad’ and ‘good’.

Soundtrack
The soundtrack features eight tracks composed by four music directors, K. Venkat Prabu Shankar, C. S. Sam, Sathish and Mervin Solomon. The album was released at the Kamarajar Stadium on 19 August 2011. A 3D trailer of the film was also showcased at the event.

See also 
 Orr Eravuu - The previous film written and directed by Hari Shankar and Harish Narayan
 Aaaah - The next film written and directed by Hari Shankar and Harish Narayan

References

External links
 
 

2012 films
2012 3D films
Indian 3D films
2010s Tamil-language films
Indian supernatural horror films
Indian science fiction horror films
2010s supernatural horror films
2010s science fiction horror films
Films scored by Sam C. S.